Eta Octantis, Latinized from η Octantis, is a solitary star located in the southern circumpolar constellation Octans. It has an apparent magnitude of 6.19, making it faintly visible to the naked eye.

Eta Octantis has a stellar classification of A1 Va, indicating that it is an ordinary A-type main sequence star. At present it has 2.37 times the Sun's mass and 2.6 times the Sun's radius.

References

Octans
A-type main-sequence stars
096124
4312
053702
PD-83 00386
Octantis, 11
Octantis, Eta